Toni Koskela (born 16 February 1983) is a Finnish football coach and a former player. He is currently managing HJK where he followed Mika Lehkosuo. Before that he was head coach of RoPS and before that the Under-19 team of HJK. He had to retire his football career in 2009, aged 26, due to numerous injuries on his knee.

After starting his career in Finland, Koskela was snapped up by Football League Championship side Cardiff City but he failed to impress at the club making just three appearances in all competitions, including an FA Cup game against Arsenal. In November 2005 he was close of signing a contract with Bristol City but Cardiff did not want to let him go, so the transfer failed. Eventually he was released by the club and quickly transferred to Greek club Ilisiakos.

He has also played for FC Jokerit, FC Hämeenlinna, FC KooTeePee in the Finnish Veikkausliiga, and Norwegian club Molde FK.

In May 2019, he was named as the new head coach of HJK Helsinki following the sacking of Mika Lehkosuo. He stated that it was good to "return back home" to HJK after signing a 2,5-year deal.

Honours 
Individual
 Veikkausliiga Coach of the Year: 2022

References

Guardian Football

External links

1983 births
Living people
Footballers from Helsinki
Finnish footballers
FC Jokerit players
Molde FK players
Cardiff City F.C. players
JJK Jyväskylä players
Veikkausliiga players
English Football League players
Eliteserien players
Norwegian First Division players
Finnish expatriate footballers
Expatriate footballers in Wales
Expatriate footballers in Greece
Expatriate footballers in Norway
Association football midfielders
21st-century Finnish people